Steve Hayes (born 1 February 1985 in Canberra, Australia) is an Australian professional soccer player who plays as a midfielder for Hong Kong First Division League club Biu Chun Rangers.

External links 
 

Australian soccer players
Living people
United Sikkim F.C. players
Sydney United 58 FC players
National Premier Leagues players
Sportspeople from Canberra
Soccer players from the Australian Capital Territory
1985 births
Association football midfielders